The 2007 Grand National (officially known as the John Smith's Grand National for sponsorship reasons) was the 160th official annual running of the world-famous Grand National steeplechase which took place at Aintree Racecourse near Liverpool, England, on 14 April 2007 and attracted the maximum permitted field of forty competitors for a total prize money of £700,000 including £399,140 to the winner.

33–1 shot Silver Birch, ridden by Robbie Power, edged out McKelvey to win the race by three-quarters of a length. Joint-favourite Point Barrow, at odds of 8–1, fell at the first fence. The meeting was attended by around 70,000 spectators at Aintree, and an estimated 16 million adults placed bets on the race.

Runners and betting
2005 Scottish Grand National winner Joe's Edge was the long-time ante-post favourite but public money on race day came for 2006 Irish Grand National winner Point Barrow after being tipped by several morning newspaper tipsters but the big plunge bets went on the heavyweight Monkerhostin who had recently run well in the Cheltenham Gold Cup. Not surprisingly the two former winners in the race, Hedgehunter, under the 11 stone 12 lb top weight and Numbersixvalverde were both heavily supported, along with Longshanks who had twice been placed in the Topham Trophy over one circuit of the course, and the 2006 Summer National winner McKelvey.

The race
Cloudy Bays broke the tape when the runners were sent off for the first time, resulting in a false start. The long delay in getting the runners set again had many on their toes and they set off at a very fast pace second time. By then Cloudy Bays had little interest in taking part and was left by thirty lengths at the start.

Joint-favourite Point Barrow caused a huge groan from the stands and for millions watching on television by falling at the first fence, ending debutant rider Philip Carberry's National within a minute of it starting. Another debut rider, Wayne Hutchinson was left hanging on to his mount Tikram until finally being unseated as the horse went to jump the second fence.

The Outlier was the first to emerge as the leader and was tracked by Bewley's Berry, Naunton Brook and Ballycassidy as the field successfully negotiated the fences down to the sixth, Becher's Brook.

At the famous brook, Dominic Elsworth found himself falling off his mount Le Duc when he shouted to nearby rival Mick Fiztgerald on board Kelami for help. Fitzgerald pushed Elsworth only for the rider to remain unbalanced and fall off the other side instead. At the same fence Jack High crumpled on landing and fell, while Davy Russell was also thrown from Livingstone Bramble, requiring a trip to hospital for precautionary X-rays on his back.

As the field continued towards the seventh fence (Foinavon) Zabenz was pulled up, a stirrup leather having broken. Monkerhostin's rider Richard Johnson was also having to contend with a broken stirrup leather but his horse was not enjoying the experience and dug his heels in at Foinavon and refused.

Naunton Brook was now in the lead as the field took the 90-degree Canal Turn with Bewley's Berry, Ballycassidy and The Outlier next. Only Tom Doyle was caught out by the sharp turn and was ejected from Knowhere out the side, while right behind them Kandjar D'allier was baulked by two loose horses and crashed into the fence, almost bringing down Homer Wells in the process.

Of the thirty-one remaining only Royal Auclair failed to negotiate the four fences along the canal side that took the field back onto the race course for the first time, falling at the first of those, Valentine's brook, badly hampering Eurotrek. 

Naunton Brook and Ballycassidy continued to set the pace as the runners came in front of the stands and made their way towards The Chair. Gallant Approach survived a bad mistake here which put him out of contention, while Cloudy Bays refused when tailed off. Dun Doire was also tailed off at this stage as the field of twenty-nine runners took the water jump and began the second circuit.

The front running Naunton Brook began to show signs of fatigue as Ballcycassidy and Bewley's Berry now took the field over the fences down to Becher's. The Outlier unshipped his rider at the 19th fence (open ditch) as well as Idle Talk, who was already beaten when he dropped a foreleg into the ditch and failed to take off. Billyvoddan was the first of the tailenders to pull up before taking the fence, and the last of the disappointing joint-favourites, Joe's Edge, did the same before the 20th when he was found to have gone lame. Both Homer Wells and Eurotrek had been struggling since they were hampered earlier in the race by fallers. Now with their chances gone they were both pulled up before Becher's Brook along with another tail ender, Celtic Son to leave twenty-two runners still racing.

Bewley's Berry was out in front and cantering when he was caught out by the steep drop at Becher's and fell, leaving Simon and Libertine in front while Graphic Approach was losing touch when he fell, while Naunton Brook was pulled up after jumping the brook.

By the second jump of the Canal Turn, Bothar Na, Sonevafushi and Kelami were losing touch. Puntal, Clan Royal, Gallant Approach and Dun Doire were beaten and tailed off.

Ballycassidy was beginning to slow when he turned too sharply and threw his rider, while at the next fence (Valentine's) Simon came down when in second place. Slim Pickings moved into the lead at the next and by the third-last was at the head of a group of ten runners that still carried chances of winning. 

The long run to the second-last flight spread the pack out with Slim Pickings taking the fence just ahead of Silver Birch. At the last, Silver Birch landed just in front and began to get away from Slim Pickings on the long run-in. At the elbow, Silver Birch began to labour and Slim Pickings fought back, with McKelvey finishing best. The finishing post came just in time for Silver Birch to win by three-quarters of a length, with McKelvey second by  lengths. Slim Pickings finished third, fifteen lengths in front of fourth placed Philson Run.

Libertine was fifth, Numbersixvalverde sixth, Longshanks seventh, Puntal eighth and Hedgehunter ninth, a distance ahead of L'ami in tenth, Clan Royal in eleventh, and Gallant Approach the last of twelve to complete. Dun Doire pulled up three fences from home, Sonevafushi and Bothar Na bypassed the second-last, and Kelami and Thisthatandtother missed out the final flight.

Finishing order

Non-finishers

Aftermath
The winning rider-trainer-owner combination were among the youngest and least experienced in the history of the race with just one National between them, being a previous ride for 25-year-old jockey Robbie Power. Trainer Gordon Elliott was the youngest in the race and won with his first National entrant while owner Brian Walsh had bought the horse for 20,000 guineas the previous year as the first horse to carry his colours in the race. With a 33/1 winner and only one horse placed at a shorter price it was also a good day for the bookmakers who retained much of the £250 million gambled in the United Kingdom alone on the race, as none of the three joint-favourites completed the course.

Starter Peter Haines came in for criticism for his handling of the start after the runners had charged the tape at the first attempt. Many race commentators felt that Haines was then too picky in trying to get a good line for the restart as he ordered the runners to turn back from the start five times before finally letting them go at the sixth attempt.

McKelvey was also found to have suffered an injury late in the race which would rule him out for almost the entire next season. The injury almost certainly cost him victory.

Winning jockey Robbie Power received a four-day ban from the stewards who found that during the run-in he had used his whip too often and also struck Silver Birch too near the stifle. Third-placed Barry Garaghty was also given a three-day ban for overuse of the whip on Slim Pickings.

Davy Russell required hospital treatment after being thrown from Livingstone Bramble at Becher's Brook on the first circuit for precautionary X-rays on his shoulder and back.
2007 was one of the warmest Nationals on record with temperatures at race time hitting 22 degrees Celsius.

Media coverage
The race was broadcast live on the BBC for the 48th consecutive year, but the first to not be run under the Grandstand banner as the final episodes would air earlier in the year on Saturday 27 January and Sunday Grandstand airing the next day on 28 January 2007. The televising of the race included cameras inside the first fence and two cameras inside jockey's caps (Jamie Moore on Thisthatandtother and Tom Doyle on Knowhere). The programme was presented by Sue Barker and Clare Balding with summary from John Parrott, Richard Pitman and Norman Williamson. The race commentary team was Ian Bartlett, Tony O'Hehir, Darren Owen and lead commentator Jim McGrath who called the runners home for the tenth year.

Jockeys
With the retirement of Carl Llewellyn, Tony McCoy, Mick Fitzgerald and Paul Carberry took over as the most experienced riders in the weighing room, each taking their twelfth ride in the National. Fitzgerald had previously won in 1996 and Carberry in 1999 but McCoy became the eighth rider to have taken twelve rides without being winner or runner-up.

Eight riders made their Grand National debut, with Tom O'Brien finishing second, Daryl Jacob fourth and Sam Waley-Cohen fifth. Wayne Hutchinson and Philip Carberry's debuts both ended at the first fence, while Denis O'Regan, David Condon and Paul O'Neill also failed to complete the course.

References 
Notes

Sources
Official BBC coverage of the 2007 Grand National

Grand National
 2007
Grand National
21st century in Merseyside
Grand
April 2007 sports events in the United Kingdom